Ilyina Gora is a rural locality (a village) in Gorod Vyazniki, Vyaznikovsky District, Vladimir Oblast, Russia. The population was 34 as of 2010.

Geography 
Ilyina Gora is located on the Klyazma River, 17 km east of Vyazniki (the district's administrative centre) by road. Perovo is the nearest rural locality.

References 

Rural localities in Vyaznikovsky District